Josef Schicklgruber (born July 21, 1967) is an Austrian retired footballer who last played for FC Pasching.

External links
  Official website

1967 births
Living people
People from Linz-Land District
Austrian footballers
Austria international footballers
SK Sturm Graz players
LASK players
SC Rheindorf Altach players
FC Juniors OÖ players
Association football goalkeepers
Footballers from Upper Austria